The Copa João Havelange Final was the final two-legged match that determined the winner of the Copa João Havelange, the 45th season of the Campeonato Brasileiro Série A. Vasco da Gama won the championship for the fourth time by defeating São Caetano 4–2 (aggregate score).

Vasco da Gama, for the Blue Module, and São Caetano, for the Yellow Module, contested the final. The São Paulo club, who reached the final as the competition surprise after winning expressive Brazilian soccer clubs, had Adhemar striker who scored 22 goals, also a competition surprise. In turn, the Rio de Janeiro club had a cast made up of players of the Brazilian team of the past and present and world champions, but had recently changed coach, which in disagreement with the vice president Eurico Miranda was fired, was hired to place Joel Santana. Joel was in charge of the team a few weeks ago, but he had the merit of ensuring a place in the final by beating Cruzeiro in Belo Horizonte.

The second match accident 
The return leg at São Januário on 30 December 2000, was marked by the incident in which about 150 people were injured. 23 minutes into the match there was a commotion in the middle of the stands after Romário was substituted because of an injury (witnesses said it all started with a turmoil in the bleachers) and it made many people fall over each other on the steps of the bleachers. Fans who fell ended up huddled in the lowest depart area, and the number of people crowded in was so great that the grid surrounding the lawn ended up falling (i.e.: the fall of the grid was not the cause but a consequence).

The lawn was taken by the crowd and the game became paralyzed as incoming ambulances and helicopters attended the wounded. After about two hours the last wounded were being removed and the referee wanted to resume the game, but then came an order from the governor Anthony Garotinho (who had seen it on TV) determining that the match should be suspended. There has been the suspension of the game and marking a new match for the day 18 January 2001.

After the accident, an expert inspection was made at the stadium by the Institute of Criminology Carlos Eboli (ICCE). The report released by the institute revealed that the stadium had a number of public high above the permitted area, and if it were not so, the number of casualties would be much smaller. According to the expertise the stadium had a capacity of just over 20,000 seating positions or 27,306 standing 5,231 less than tickets sold. With that Vasco da Gama was eventually blamed for the incident. In addition to overcrowding, the institute concluded that the grid that collapsed was in poor condition and suffering from corrosion.

First match

Suspended match

Second match

References

Copa João Havelange
Associação Desportiva São Caetano matches
CR Vasco da Gama matches
Stadium disasters
Man-made disasters in Brazil